This is the discography of Talib Kweli, an American rapper.

Albums

Solo albums

Collaborative albums

Mixtapes
2004: The Beautiful Mix CD
2005: The Beautiful Mixtape Vol. 2: The Struggle Continues
2005: Right About Now: The Official Sucka Free Mix CD - Charted #113 on the Billboard 200 and #24 on US R&B/Hip-Hop Albums.
2006: Brooklyn, Tennessee
2006: Kweli: Confidential
2006: Blacksmith: The Movement
2007: Clinton Sparks & Talib Kweli: Get Familiar
2007: Focus
2008: The MCEO Mixtape
2009: Party Robot (with Idle Warship)
2009: The Re:Union (with Reflection Eternal) (Mixed by Statik Selektah)
2010: Early Mourning Signs
2011: We Run This Vol. 7 (with Mr. E)
2012: Attack the Block
2014: Javotti Media Presents: The Cathedral
2015: Train of Thought: Lost Lyrics, Rare Releases & Beautiful B-Sides Vol.1
2016: Awful People Are Great at Parties

Singles

Solo singles

Collaborative singles

Soundtracks
2011: Beat The World

Promotional singles

Guest appearances

See also
Black Star discography

References

Hip hop discographies
Discographies of American artists